Fortunato Natale Perri Jr. is an attorney for the firm of McMonagle, Perri & McHugh, located in Philadelphia, Pennsylvania. Perri is notable for being the defense attorney representing hip hop artists Beanie Sigel and Cassidy.

References

Living people
Pennsylvania lawyers
Year of birth missing (living people)